Artipus floridanus, the little leaf notcher, is a species of broad-nosed weevil in the beetle family Curculionidae. It is found in North America.

References

Further reading

External links

 

Entiminae
Beetles described in 1876